Norki, until 1945 known as Nordenberg, is a hamlet in Warmian-Masurian Voivodeship, Poland located in the Gmina Wieliczki, Olecko County. It was established in 1822 as a folwark of nearby village of Nory.

References

Norki